The 1949–50 Eredivisie season was the fourth season of the Eredivisie, the top level of ice hockey in the Netherlands. Three teams participated in the league, and Ijsvogels Amsterdam won the championship.

Regular season

External links
Nederlandse IJshockey Bond

Eredivisie (ice hockey) seasons
Neth
1949–50 in Dutch ice hockey